Michael Lawrence Marsh (born August 4, 1967) is a retired American sprinter, the 1992 Olympic champion in the 200 m.

Biography
Marsh was born in Los Angeles, and attended high school at Hawthorne High School in Hawthorne, California where he was overshadowed by Henry Thomas, who he joined on numerous championship relays. Marsh, Thomas, Michael Graham and Sean Kelly joined to bring Hawthorne the National High School Record in the 4 × 400 m relay set at the Texas Relays. The team joined to celebrate the silver anniversary of the record in 2010. When Thomas was sidelined with an appendix attack, requiring surgery just before the qualification cycle, Marsh won the 1985 CIF California State Meet in the 200 m. He continued running with Thomas at UCLA, his best achievement was a third place at the NCAA Championships. He was inducted into the UCLA Athletics Hall of Fame in 2016.

Although Marsh could compete with the national class sprinters, he did not manage to qualify for an international event until 1991, when he qualified for the American relay team for the 1991 World Championships. Marsh ran in the heats on a team that set the Championship record, but not in the final, which was won by the Americans in World Record time. The next year, Marsh posted a time of 9.93s into a wind of 0.6 m/s at the Mt. SAC Relays in Walnut, which using a widely accepted wind/altitude correction calculator adjusted to the fastest ever intrinsic 100 m time recorded at that time in history. That was the second of what became a trend, a succession of eight early season outstanding 100 m marks set by Marsh at the Mt. SAC Relays. Marsh was elected into the Mt. SAC Relays Hall of Fame in 2003.

At the 1992 US Olympic Trials, Marsh disappointingly finished fourth in the 100 m, not enough for individual qualification, but sufficient to make the relay team. In the 200 m, he placed second to Michael Johnson and qualified for the Barcelona Olympics,.

In Barcelona, Marsh surprised all observers in his semi-final. He cruised through the race, simply securing qualification for the final. His qualifying time, however, was 19.73, just one hundredth of a second slower than the standing world record (and it was the American Record). This run was remarkable for the fact that he eased off ten metres from the line, stating in later interviews that he hadn't realised how fast he was running and wanted to save some energy for the final, which was to be held only a few hours later.  See the race. Unofficial split analysis from video of that run indicates he would have run faster than the world record at the time, Pietro Mennea's altitude-assisted 19.72s, if he hadn't eased off. An improvement of this record was anticipated for the final, but Marsh could not live up to those expectations. He did win the race however, beating early leader Frankie Fredericks of Namibia. He did set a world record in the final of the 4 x 100 m, as the American team completed the race in 37.40.

As the reigning Olympic champion, he surprisingly did not medal in the 200 m at the 1993 World Championships, placing fourth. His 1994 season went without a win, but he did lead off the Santa Monica Track Club's 4 × 200 m relay at the Mt. SAC Relays when the team of Marsh, Leroy Burrell, Floyd Heard and Carl Lewis set a world record in the event that would stand until 2014. He returned strongly in 1995. He won the national championships in the 100 m, and represented his country in that event at the World Championships. There, he disappointed, finishing fifth in the final. The disappointment was complete when the relay team failed to finish the heats after a bad exchange.

In 1996, Marsh managed to qualify for all three sprint events at the 1996 Summer Olympics in Atlanta, and he reached the final of all three. In the 100 m, he placed 5th and in his attempt to retain his 200 m title (which was taken by Johnson in a new world record time) he finished last. The American relay team, with Marsh as the third runner, was heavily favoured to take the 4 x 100 m title, but they were surprised by the Canadian team in the final, and had to settle for silver.

He again qualified for the 100 m final at the 1997 World Championships, where he placed last due to a foot injury that required immediate surgery.

In 2021 he was elected into the National Track and Field Hall of Fame.

References

External links 
 Michael Marsh at USATF
 
 
 

1967 births
Living people
African-American male track and field athletes
American male sprinters
Athletes (track and field) at the 1992 Summer Olympics
Athletes (track and field) at the 1996 Summer Olympics
Olympic gold medalists for the United States in track and field
Olympic silver medalists for the United States in track and field
Track and field athletes from Los Angeles
UCLA Bruins men's track and field athletes
Sportspeople from Hawthorne, California
Medalists at the 1996 Summer Olympics
Medalists at the 1992 Summer Olympics
Universiade medalists in athletics (track and field)
Goodwill Games medalists in athletics
Universiade gold medalists for the United States
USA Outdoor Track and Field Championships winners
World Athletics Championships winners
Competitors at the 1990 Goodwill Games
Competitors at the 1994 Goodwill Games
21st-century African-American people
20th-century African-American sportspeople